What Happened to Mr. Cha? is a 2021 South Korean comedy film directed and written by Dong-kyu Kim and starring Cha In-pyo and Jae-Ryong Song.

Synopsis 
Cha In-Pyo was once a famous actor but is now barely relevant. He refuses to accept reality even when disaster strikes.

Cast 
 Cha In-pyo as Cha In-Pyo
 Song Jae-ryong as A-Ram
 Jo Jan-Joon
 Cho Dal-hwan
 Song Duk-ho as Jung-ho
 Shin Shin-ae as Bok-soon

References

External links 
 
 
 

2021 films
2020s Korean-language films
South Korean comedy films
Korean-language Netflix original films
2021 comedy films
South Korean satirical films
2020s satirical films
Films about actors
Comedy films based on actual events